Eric Lawrence Gans (born August 21, 1941) is an American literary scholar, philosopher of language, and cultural anthropologist. Since 1969, he has taught, and published on, 19th century literature, critical theory, and film in the UCLA Department of French and Francophone studies.

Gans invented a new science of human culture and origins he calls generative anthropology, based on the idea that the origin of language was a singular event and that the history of human culture is a genetic or "generative" development of that event. In a series of books and articles beginning with The Origin of Language: A Formal Theory of Representation (1981), Gans has developed his ideas about human culture, language, and origins. In 1995, Gans founded (and continues to edit) the web-based journal Anthropoetics: The Journal of Generative Anthropology as a scholarly forum for research into human culture and origins based on generative anthropology and the closely related fundamental anthropology of René Girard. Since 1995, Gans has web-published his "Chronicles of Love and Resentment", consisting of reflections on everything from popular culture, film, post-modernism, economics, contemporary politics, the Holocaust, philosophy, religion, and paleoanthropology. In 2010, the Generative Anthropology Society & Conference was created for sponsoring annual conferences dedicated to generative anthropology.

Generative anthropology

Background
Generative anthropology grew out of Gans's association with Girard at Johns Hopkins University. Gans was one of Girard's first doctoral students, receiving his PhD in 1966. But it was only on the publication of Violence and the Sacred in 1972 that Gans became interested in Girard's idea of mimetic desire and the connection between violence and the sacred in Girard's work. The concept of mimetic desire forms one of the cornerstones of generative anthropology. Girard argues that human desire is essentially cultural or social in nature, and thus distinct from mere appetite, which is biological. For Girard, desire is triangular in structure, an imitation of the desire of another. Desire, therefore, leads to conflict, when two individuals attempt to possess the same object. In a group, this mimetic conflict typically escalates into a mimetic crisis which threatens the very existence of the group. For Girard, this conflict is resolved by the scapegoat mechanism, in which the destructive energies of the group are purged through the violence directed towards an arbitrarily selected victim. Girard sees the scapegoating mechanism as the origin of human culture and language.

Originary hypothesis
Gans agrees with Girard that human language originates in the context of a mimetic crisis, but he does not find the scapegoat mechanism, by itself, as an adequate explanation for the origin of language. Gans hypothesizes that language originates in "an aborted gesture of appropriation", which signifies the desired object as sacred and which memorializes the birth of language, serving as the basis for rituals which recreate the originary event symbolically. The originary sign serves to defer the mimetic violence threatening the group, hence Gans's capsule definition of culture as "the deferral of violence through representation". For a more detailed explanation of the originary hypothesis, see generative anthropology.

Scene of representation
For Gans, language is essentially "scenic" in character, that is, structurally defined by a sacred center and human periphery. In the secular culture which develops later, "significance" serves as an attenuated form of the sacred. The scene of representation is a true cultural universal and the basic model for cultural analysis. Generative anthropology attempts to understand the various means by which transcendence or meaning (which is always ethically functional) is created on a scene of representation.

Life and education
Eric Lawrence Gans was born in the Bronx, New York, on August 21, 1941. He went to Columbia University at the age of 16 and received a B.A. in French (summa cum laude) in 1960. Going on to graduate work in Romance languages at Johns Hopkins University, he received his M.A. in 1961 and a Ph.D (with distinction) in 1966. After two years as an assistant professor at Indiana University, he moved to the Department of French at University of California, Los Angeles (UCLA) in 1969, where he became full professor in 1976. In 1978, he served at Johns Hopkins University as a visiting professor. From 2007 until 2014 he was honored as a distinguished professor at UCLA until he resigned after being found in violation of the UCLA sexual misconduct policy. Since 2015, he is Distinguished Professor Emeritus at UCLA but is forbidden to teach or advise students.

Sexual harassment allegations
In 2015, Gans was found guilty of violating the UC Policy on Sexual Harassment and the Faculty Code of Conduct. In 2011–2012, Gans began sending unwanted and unsolicited emails to his female graduate student, professing his love for her. Gans acknowledged the feelings were one-sided: "There is no doubt an asymmetry in our affection". According to the results of the Title IX investigation launched in response to the student's complaints, Gans continued his advancements after his student repeatedly tried to get him to cease.

Gans, however, denied his advances were unwanted in an interview with The Daily Californian: "I'm an old-fashioned guy. I treat women with a kind of reverence. Some women appreciate this, but some don't." Gans alleged the Title IX investigation was a set-up orchestrated by the department chair and described his former student as "a weak person, she was intimidated by them, [and] she wasn't the best student".

Critics 

The main source of criticism directed against Gans's work comes from Girard himself, who claims that generative anthropology is just another version of social contract theories of origins. Gans has responded to Girard's criticisms and defended his theory in his books and articles. Others take issue with Gans's conservative political views as expressed in his Chronicles of Love and Resentment. Gans has entered into conversation with contrasting views on Middle Eastern politics in his published dialogue with Ammar Abdulhamid: "A Dialogue on the Middle East and Other Subjects".

Generative Anthropology Society & Conference
The Generative Anthropology Society & Conference (GASC) is a scholarly association formed for the purpose of facilitating intellectual exchange amongst those interested in fundamental reflection on the human, originary thinking, and generative anthropology, including support for regular conferences. GASC was formally organized on June 24, 2010, at Westminster College, Salt Lake City, during the 4th Annual Generative Anthropology Summer Conference.

Since 2007, Generative Anthropology Society & Conference (GASC) has held an annual summer conference on generative anthropology. The 14th summer conference, which was to be held at Bar-Ilan University, was cancelled due to the COVID-19 pandemic.

 2007 – Kwantlen University College of University of British Columbia (Vancouver, British Columbia)
 2008 – Chapman University (Orange, California)
 2009 – University of Ottawa (Ottawa, Canada)
 2010 – Westminster College (Salt Lake City, Utah) and Brigham Young University (Provo, Utah)
 2011 – High Point University (High Point, North Carolina)
 2012 – International Christian University (Tokyo, Japan)
 2013 – University of California, Los Angeles
 2014 – University of Victoria (Victoria, British Columbia)
 2015 – High Point University (High Point, North Carolina)
 2016 – Kinjo Gakuin University (Nagoya, Japan)
 2017 – Stockholm University (Stockholm, Sweden)
 2018 – Cardinal Stefan Wyszynski University (Warsaw, Poland)
 2019 – NYC Conference Center (New York City)

Honors
 Phi Beta Kappa (elected in junior year)
 Woodrow Wilson fellow 1960–61
 Prix de la langue française – Académie française 1977
 Chevalier des Palmes Académiques 1982

Bibliography

Books
The Discovery of Illusion: Flaubert's Early Works, 1835–37. University of California Press, 1971.
The Origin of Language: A Formal Theory of Representation. University of California Press, 1981.
The End of Culture: Toward a Generative Anthropology. University of California Press, 1985.
Madame Bovary: The End of Romance. Boston: G. K. Hall (Twayne's Masterwork Studies), 1989.
Science and Faith: The Anthropology of Revelation. Savage, Maryland: Rowman & Littlefield, 1990.
Originary Thinking: Elements of Generative Anthropology. Stanford University Press, 1993.
Signs of Paradox: Irony, Resentment, and Other Mimetic Structures. Stanford University Press, 1997.
The Scenic Imagination: Originary Thinking from Hobbes to the Present Day. Stanford University Press, 2007.
Carole Landis: A Most Beautiful Girl. University of Mississippi Press, 2008.
A New Way of Thinking: Generative Anthropology in Religion, Philosophy, Art. The Davies Group, 2011.
The Girardian Origins of Generative Anthropology. Imitatio/Amazon Digital Services, 2012.
bijela krivnja / white guilt. Zagreb, Croatia: Kršćanska Sadašnjost, 2013.
Les fleurs du mal: a new translation. New York: Spuyten Duyvil Publishing, 2015.
Science and Faith: The Anthropology of Revelation. Second edition. Aurora Colo.: Noesis Press (Deferrals & Disciplines), 2015.
(with Adam Katz) The First Shall Be The Last: Rethinking Antisemitism. Leiden: Brill, 2015.

Selected articles
"Scandal to the Jews, Folly to the Pagans." Diacritics 9, 3, (Fall 1979): 43–53.
"Differences." Modern Language Notes 96 (French, Spring 1981): 792–808.
"Beckett and the Problem of Modern Culture." SubStance XI, 2 (1982): 3–15.
"The Culture of Resentment." Philosophy and Literature 8, 1 (April 1984): 55–66.
"Christian morality and the Pauline Revelation." Semeia 33 (1985): 97–108.
"Sacred Text in Secular Culture." In To Honor René Girard, Stanford French & Italian Studies 34, (1986): 51–64.
"Art and Entertainment." Perspectives of New Music 24, 1 (Fall–Winter 1985): 24–37.
"The Necessity of Fiction." SubStance 50 (September 1986): 36–47.
"The Past and Future of Generative Anthropology: Reflections on the Departmental Colloquium." Paroles Gelées: UCLA French Studies 8 (1990): 35–41.
"The Beginning and End of Esthetic Form." Perspectives of New Music 29, 2 (Summer 1991): 8–21.
"The Unique Source of Religion and Morality." Anthropoetics 1, 1 (June 1995): 10 pp. Revised version in Contagion 3 (Spring 1996): 51–65.
"Mimetic Paradox and the Event of Human Origin." Anthropoetics 1, 2 (December 1995): 15 pp.
"Plato and the Birth of Conceptual Thought." Anthropoetics 2, 2 (January 1997): 11 pp.
"Chronicles of Love and Resentment" [selections]. Epoché XX (1995–96): 1–22.
"The Holocaust and the Victimary Revolution." In Poetics of the Americas: Race, Founding, and Textuality, Baton Rouge and London: Louisiana State University Press, 1997, 123–139.
"Originary Narrative." Anthropoetics 3, 2 (February 1998): 10 pp.
"Aesthetics and Cultural Criticism." Boundary 2 25, 1 (Spring 1998): 67–85.
"The Little Bang: The Early Origin of Language." Anthropoetics 5, 1 (Spring/Summer 1999) : 6 pp. Also in Contagion 7 (Spring 2000): 1–17.
"The Last Word in Lyric: Mallarmé's Silent Siren." New Literary History 30, 4 (Autumn 1999): 785–814.
"'Staging as an Anthropological Category.'" New Literary History 31, 1 (Winter 2000): 45–56.
"The Sacred and the Social: Defining Durkheim's Anthropological Legacy." Anthropoetics 6, 1 (Spring / Summer 2000): 7 pp.
"Form Against Content: René Girard's Theory of Tragedy." Revista Portuguesa de Filosofia 56, 1–2 (January–June 2000): 53–65.
"The Body Sacrificial." In The Body Aesthetic: From Fine Art to Body Modification, ed. Tobin Siebers, Ann Arbor: University of Michigan Press, 2000, 159–178.
"Originary Democracy and the Critique of Pure Fairness." In The Democratic Experience and Political Violence, ed. David C. Rapoport and Leonard Weinberg, London: Frank Cass, 2001, 308–324. Also issued as Terrorism and Political Violence 12, 3–4 (Autumn/Winter 2000).
"Mallarmé contra Wagner." Philosophy and Literature 25, 1 (April 2001): 14–30.
(with Ammar Abdulhamid) "A Dialogue on the Middle East and Other Subjects." Anthropoetics 7, 2 (Fall 2001 / Winter 2002): 16 pp. Also (in two parts) in Maaber 8 (Fall 2002) and 9 (fourth quarter, 2002).
"Originary and/or Kantian Aesthetics."  (Munich) 35, 3–4 (2003): 335–353.
"End of an Illusion." [on Quentin Tarantino] Cinematic: The Harvard Annual Film Review 2 (2004): 29–31.
"The Market and Resentment." In Passions in Economy, Politics, and the Media, ed.  and Petra Steinmar-Pösel, Vienna: Lit Verlag, 2005, 85–102.
"Clouzot's Cruel Crow." p.o.v.: A Danish Journal of Film Studies 20 (12/2005): 51–58.
"John Rawls's Originary Theory of Justice." Contagion 13 (2006): 149–158.
"White Guilt, Past and Future." Anthropoetics 12, 2 (Fall 2006/Winter 2007): 8 pp.
"Qu'est-ce que la littérature, aujourd'hui?" New Literary History 38, 1 (Winter 2007): 33–41.
(with Antun Pavešković) "Razgovor o generativnoj antropologiji" [Conversation about generative anthropology]; "Podrijetlo jezika" [The origin of language]. Republika (Zagreb) LXIII, 5 (May 2007): 48–76.
"On Firstness" (45–57) and "Generative Anthropology and Bronx Romanticism" (153–164). The Originary Hypothesis: A Minimal Proposal for Humanistic Inquiry (ed. Adam Katz), Davies Publishing Group, 2007.
"Generative Anthropology: A New Way of Thinking?" Anthropoetics 13, 2 (Special GATE Issue, Fall 2007).
"La priméité: de l'origine à l'Holocauste et au-delà." In René Girard. Paris: L'Herne, 2008, 255–260.
"Religion et connaissance." Intellectica. 50 (2008/3): 61–72.
"René et moi." In For René Girard. ed. Goodhart et al., East Lansing: Michigan State University Press, 2009, 19–25.
Interview with  August 2009.
"Hermeneutika" [Hermeneutics]. Republika. (Zagreb) LXVI, 1 (January 2010): 46–50.
"A Brief Analysis of Deconstruction." Dialectic (University of Utah School of Architecture), 1 (2011–12): 31–34.
"Eric Gans traduit Les Fleurs du mal de Baudelaire." [Introduction and translations of twelve sonnets.] Po&sie 144 (Fall 2013): 146–158.
Foreword to Ammar Abdulhamid, The Irreverent Activist. Self-published, 2014: xxiii–xxvi.
"On the One Medium." In Mimesis, Movies, and Media, (Violence, Desire, and the Sacred 3), eds. Scott Cowdell, Chris Fleming, and Joel Hodge. New York and London: Bloomsbury, 2015, 7–15.

References

External links
Gans's profile, UCLA
Anthropoetics: The Journal of Generative Anthropology
Chronicles of Love and Resentment (archived June 2013)
Generative Anthropology Society & Conference

Living people
1941 births
Linguists from the United States
American anthropologists